Okrug is a municipality in Croatia in the Split-Dalmatia County. It has a population of 3,349 (2011 census), 95% of which are Croats.

References

Populated places in Split-Dalmatia County
Municipalities of Croatia